Kholm is a town and the administrative center of Kholmsky District in Novgorod Oblast, Russia, located at the confluence of the Lovat and Kunya Rivers,  north of Toropets,  southwest of Staraya Russa, and  south of Veliky Novgorod, the administrative center of the oblast. Population:

History
The Lovat River was a part of the trade route from the Varangians to the Greeks, one of the oldest trading routes passing through Rus'. The settlement was first mentioned in 1144 as Kholmsky pogost. During the Middle Ages, the town, then a seat of the Princes of Kholm, withstood innumerable sieges by Lithuanians, Poles, and Swedes.

In 1777, it was elevated in status to that of an uyezd town of Pskov Viceroyalty and given its present name. In 1796, it was transferred to Pskov Governorate. In August 1927, the uyezds were abolished and, effective October 1, 1927, Kholmsky District was established, with the administrative center in Kholm. Pskov Governorate was abolished as well and the district became a part of Velikiye Luki Okrug of Leningrad Oblast. On June 3, 1929, Velikiye Luki Okrug was transferred to Western Oblast. On July 23, 1930 the okrugs were abolished and the districts were directly subordinated to the oblast. On January 29, 1935, the district became a part of the newly established Kalinin Oblast.

During World War II, it was occupied by the Wehrmacht from August 3, 1941 to February 21, 1944, when it was liberated. It was the scene of the Kholm Pocket from January 21 to May 5, 1942. The town was completely ruined and even now its current population is only a third of the pre-war one.

On July 5, 1944, the district was included in newly established Novgorod Oblast, but already on August 22, 1944 it was transferred to newly established Velikiye Luki Oblast. On October 2, 1957, Velikiye Luki Oblast was abolished and Kholmsky District was transferred to Pskov Oblast. On July 29, 1958, it was transferred to Novgorod Oblast and remained there ever since.

Administrative and municipal status
Within the framework of administrative divisions, Kholm serves as the administrative center of Kholmsky District. As an administrative division, it is incorporated within Kholmsky District as the town of district significance of Kholm. As a municipal division, the town of district significance of Kholm is incorporated within Kholmsky Municipal District as Kholmskoye Urban Settlement.

Economy

Industry
The economy of Kholm and its district is based on timber industry.

Transportation
Kholm is connected by roads to Staraya Russa, to Bezhanitsy, to Demyansk via Maryovo, and to Toropets.

The Lovat and the Kunya Rivers are not navigable in Kholm.

Culture and recreation
Kholm contains eight monuments classified as cultural and historical heritage of local significance. Seven of them are graves of and monuments to soldiers fallen in World War II, while the eighth one is an archaeological site.

In the dense woods and impracticable swamps to the west of Kholm lies the deserted Rdeysky Monastery.

Kholm hosts the Kholmsky District Museum which was opened in 1983.

References

Notes

Sources

External links

Official website of Kholm 
Kholm Business Directory 

Cities and towns in Novgorod Oblast
Kholmsky Uyezd (Pskov Governorate)